Agostino Bernal (born at Magallon in Aragon in 1587; died at Saragossa, 13 September 1642) was a Spanish Jesuit theologian.

Life

He entered the Society of Jesus in 1603 when sixteen years old. A classical scholar, he taught humanities and rhetoric with success. The greater part of his life, however, he spent as professor of philosophy and theology at Saragossa.

Works

His published works are: 

"Disputationes de Divini Verbi Incarnatione" (Saragossa, 1639); 
"Disputationes de Sacramentis in genere, Eucharistia et Ordine" (Lyons, 1651) a posthumous work.

References

Attribution
 The entry cites:
Southwell, Bibliotheca, 93; 
Hugo von Hurter, Nomenclator, 380.

1587 births
1642 deaths
17th-century Spanish Jesuits
17th-century Spanish Roman Catholic theologians
Spanish philosophers
Academic staff of the University of Zaragoza